Caubous is a commune in the Haute-Garonne department in southwestern France.

With a population of four inhabitants in 2019, it is the least populated commune in the department.

Population

See also
Communes of the Haute-Garonne department

References

Communes of Haute-Garonne